The Al Shaheen Oil Field is a production oil and gas field off the north east coast of Qatar in the Persian Gulf,  north of Doha. The oil field lies above the North Gas Field, one of the largest gas fields in the world. The field has been operated by Maersk Oil Qatar AS of Denmark until July 2017 under a production sharing agreement with QatarEnergy, on behalf of the state of Qatar. As of June 2016, QatarEnergy and the French major TotalEnergies established a new company known as "North Oil Company (Qatar)". The new company is 70% owned by QatarEnergy and 30% by TotalEnergies. North Oil Company took over field operations on 14 July 2017.

History
Though well North West Deep-2, drilled by Shell in 1974, blew out briefly from the Shaheen reservoir, the oil field was only formally discovered in 1992 by Maersk Oil. The drilling of appraisal wells was completed in 1994 using horizontal drilling techniques. Regular oil production started the same year. In 1995–1996, production facilities were extended with subsea export pipelines, an additional single point mooring loading buoy, new process facilities and a STAR type wellhead platform.

In April 2004, the extension area north of block 5 was included to the production sharing agreement.  Inauguration of new offshore facilities took place on 23 February 2005.

In May 2008, Maersk Oil drilled the world record extended reach well BD-04A in the field with the GSF Rig 127 operated by Transocean.

From 2004 until August 2009 the massive supertanker, Knock Nevis, the largest ship built to date, was moored there as a floating storage and offloading unit (FSO). In January 2010, she was replaced by both the FSO Asia, and in August 2010, the FSO Africa replaced the Astro Canopus. Both vessels are owned as a joint venture by Overseas Shipholding Group and Euronav.

In June 2016 France's TotalEnergies won a tender to replace Maersk Oil as operator of Al Shaheen Oil Field and commenced operating the field on 14 July 2017 under a joint venture agreement between Total (30%) and QatarEnergy (70%) through a new company named North Oil Company.

Geology
The oil and gas producing formation is the Kharaib, Shuaiba and Nahr Umr Formations (Early Cretaceous). The field is characterized by low permeability, limited thickness, and geological complexity.

Production
The field consists of 131 operational production and water injection wells, 18 permanent platforms, and six production installations connected by 20 pipelines. Although the production capacity reaches , the current actual production is only  due to OPEC quotas. This increase is expected to account for the majority of growth in Qatar's petroleum output over this time.

Oil is currently stored in the floating storage and offloading vessels FSO Asia and FSO Africa. Produced oil is transported to the Mesaieed Industrial City for processing and export. There is a plan to build a new  refinery in Mesaieed to process oil from Al Shaheen. This plan has been postponed.

The Al-Shaheen field also produces associated gas.

Records 
The Kola Superdeep Borehole was the longest and deepest borehole in the world for nearly 20 years. However, in May 2008, a new record for borehole length was established by the extended-reach drilling (ERD) well BD-04A, in the Al Shaheen oil field.

On 28 January 2011, Exxon Neftegas Ltd., operator of the Sakhalin-I project, drilled the world's longest extended-reach well offshore on the Russian island of Sakhalin. It has surpassed the length of both the Al Shaheen well and the Kola borehole. Exxon Neftegas completed the well in 60 days.

On 27 August 2012, Exxon Neftegas Ltd beat its own record by completing the Z-44 Chayvo well.

References

Oil fields of Qatar
Deepest boreholes
Maersk Oil
Denmark–Qatar relations